The Lithuanian Students Basketball League (Lithuanian: Lietuvos studentų krepšinio lyga, LSKL) is the Lithuanian men's and women's students basketball league. The league was founded in September, 1998 and currently has two men's divisions with 19 teams and one women's division with 6 teams. Professional basketball players are allowed to compete in the league as well.

LSKL men's teams

First men's division

Second men's division

LSKL women's teams

External links 
Official LSKL website
Official LSKL Facebook page

References 

1998 establishments in Lithuania
Basketball leagues in Lithuania
Sports leagues established in 1998